Constantinos Mina (born May 1, 1974) is a Cypriot retired defender who used to play for AEK Larnaca.

Honours
AEK Larnaca
 Cypriot Cup: 2003–04

References

External links

1974 births
Living people
Cypriot footballers
Cypriot First Division players
AEK Larnaca FC players
Association football defenders
Nea Salamis Famagusta FC managers